Signpine is an unincorporated community in Gloucester County, in the U. S. state of Virginia.

References

Unincorporated communities in Virginia
Unincorporated communities in Gloucester County, Virginia